LCRG may refer to:

 Lilac City Roller Girls, from Spokane, Washington
 Little City Roller Girls, from Johnson City, Tennessee